Iijärvi is a medium-sized lake in the Iijoki main catchment area. It is located in the Northern Ostrobothnia region. The lake is formed of many long and narrow bays. One of the bays nearly reach the Finnish National Road 5 and there is a hotel on the strand.

See also
List of lakes in Finland

References

Lakes of Kuusamo